Richard Boykin Kellam (May 30, 1909 – June 8, 1996) was a United States district judge of the United States District Court for the Eastern District of Virginia.

Education and career

Born in Princess Anne County, Virginia, Kellam read law to enter the bar in 1934. He was in private practice in Virginia from 1934 to 1960. He was a judge of the Circuit Court for the 28th Judicial Circuit of Virginia from 1960 to 1967.

Federal judicial service

On July 17, 1967, Kellam was nominated by President Lyndon B. Johnson to a new seat on the United States District Court for the Eastern District of Virginia created by 80 Stat. 75. He was confirmed by the United States Senate on August 18, 1967, and received his commission on August 25, 1967. He served as Chief Judge from 1973 to 1979, and assumed senior status on May 30, 1981. Kellam served in that capacity until his death, on June 8, 1996, in Virginia Beach, Virginia.

Family

Kellam was part of a well known political family in Southeast Virginia. His father, Abel Kellam, served as clerk of the Princess Anne Circuit Court for 20 years. The Chesapeake Bay Bridge-Tunnel, is officially named the Lucius J. Kellam Jr. Bridge-Tunnel, named after an uncle. Floyd E. Kellam High School is named after a brother who was a circuit court judge. Another brother, Sidney Kellam, was the county's political leader for 40 years and engineered the merger of Virginia Beach and Princess Anne County. His son, Phillip Kellam was Commissioner of the Revenue for Virginia Beach for 12 years and later ran unsuccessfully for Congress.

References

Sources
 

1909 births
1996 deaths
Judges of the United States District Court for the Eastern District of Virginia
United States district court judges appointed by Lyndon B. Johnson
20th-century American judges
United States federal judges admitted to the practice of law by reading law